Oak Grove is an unincorporated community in Grant Parish, Louisiana, United States.

Unincorporated communities in Louisiana
Unincorporated communities in Grant Parish, Louisiana